Qianshan Railway Station is an elevated station on the Guangzhou–Zhuhai intercity railway. It is located in Qianshan, Xiangzhou District, Zhuhai, Guangdong Province, China.

The station entered service when all remaining stations in the Zhuhai section of the Guangzhu ICR opened on 31December 2012.

References

Railway stations in Guangdong
Zhuhai
Railway stations in China opened in 2012